Byeonhan, also known as Byeonjin, was a loose confederacy of chiefdoms that existed from around the beginning of the Common Era to the 4th century in the southern Korean peninsula. Byeonhan was one of the Samhan (or "Three Hans"), along with Mahan and Jinhan.

History
This early part of the Three Kingdoms period is sometimes called the Proto–Three Kingdoms period. Byeonhan, like the other Samhan confederacies, appears descended from the Jin state of southern Korea.

Archaeological evidence indicates an increase in military activity and weapons production among the Byeonhan in the 3rd century, especially an increase in iron arrowheads and cuirasses (Barnes 2000). This may be associated with the decline of Byeonhan and the rise of the more centralized Gaya Confederacy, which most Byeonhan states joined. Gaya was subsequently annexed by Silla, one of the Three Kingdoms of Korea.

Byeonhan was a country created by combining immigrants called Byeon, existing Jin people and Han people. Among them, it is not clear to which ethnic group Byeon refers.

There are three primary hypotheses about the Byeon ethnic group:

 Before the unification of the Qin Dynasty, the mysterious maritime Wa people present in the Yangtze River and Shandong Peninsula.
 The maritime people in Heo Hwang-ok legend at least claimed to be from India, Ayuta Kingdom
 Any ethnic who traveled through ancient southern trade routes seen through the distribution of dolmens culture. According to recent studies that excavated Kofuns in South Jeolla Province, analysis of the components of glass beads there suggests that the raw material production area is Thailand

Culture and trade
The Chinese Records of Three Kingdoms states that the language and culture of Byeonhan was essentially the same as Jinhan, and archaeological artifacts show little difference. Byeonhan may have simply referred to the chiefdoms in the south and west of the Nakdong River valley which were not formal members of the Jinhan confederacy.

However, there are a few cultural aspects that were unique to Byeonhan. One notable tradition was full-body tattooing, which was done by both men and women. Another tradition was the burying of feathers and pottery in graves alongside the dead body as it was believed that the feathers helped the afterlife souls fly into the sky.

According to the 3rd-century Chinese chronicle Records of Three Kingdoms, Byeonhan was known for the production of iron; it exported iron to the commanderies of the Han dynasty to the north, Yamato Japan, and the rest of the Korean peninsula. It was also a center of stoneware manufacture.

Member statelets
According to the Records of Three Kingdoms, Byeonhan consisted of 12 statelets:

 Mirimidong, present-day Miryang.
 Jeopdo, present-day Haman.
 Gojamidong, present-day Goseong.
 Gosunsi, present-day Jinju, Sacheon or Goseong.
 Ballo, present-day Seongju.
 Nangno, present-day Hadong or Namhae.
 Gunmi, present-day Sacheon.
 Mioyama, present-day Goryeong.
 Gamno, present-day Gimcheon.
 Guya, present-day Gimhae.
 Jujoma, present-day Gimcheon.
 Anya, present-day Haman.
 Dongno, present-day Dongnae.

References
Barnes, G.L. (2000). "Archeological armor in Korea and Japan: Styles, technology and social setting".  Journal of East Asian Archeology 2 (3–4), 61–96. (Electronic Version). 

Ancient peoples
Early Korean history
Former countries in Korean history
Gaya confederacy
States and territories established in the 1st century
States and territories disestablished in the 4th century
Former confederations